The Basic Sciences Examination is run by the Royal Australasian College of Surgeons for surgical trainees who are in the Surgical Education and Training Program. The exam is conducted in February and June of every year for all surgical candidates, and is composed of written and clinical formats. Only candidates in a surgical training program in Australia or New Zealand can take part in the examinations.

The written format is composed of Generic and Specialty Specific examinations. In total there are 3 written examinations each running for 2.5 hours. The clinical component is in the form of an Objective Structured Clinical Examination composed of 16 stations, and usually runs for 2 hours.

Generic exam 
The Generic exam is composed of two written papers, each with 120 questions. There are three formats of questions, namely: relationship type, choose one best answer and true / false type questions.

All candidates are expected to sit the Generic exam in their first year of training. Further advancement in training cannot be gained if this exam is not passed. The examination is run at multiple centers across Australia and New Zealand.

The disciplines covered in this exam include: anatomy, physiology, clinical scenarios, pathology (including genetics), histopathology, cellular biology, immunology, pharmacology and statistics. The latter three disciplines are combined into pathology when determining the pass mark for each discipline.

Specialty-specific exam 
All candidates must sit their own specialty-specific exam with questions aimed in their discipline. There are also general questions which are relevant for all specialties. General Surgery and Urology candidates sit a combined specialty paper. All other specialties have their own separate papers.

All specialty-specific exams have 120 questions, with the same format as the Generic Exam. The pass mark is determined using multiple statistical analysis, and the performance analysis of "marker" questions.

Objective structured clinical examination 
All candidates must participate in this examination, which has 16 stations in total. There are four core components to this examination: History taking, Examination performance, Procedural competence, and Counseling/Obtaining consent.

There are 4 stations associated with each core component. Each station runs for 5 minutes duration, with 1 minute reading time prior. Candidates are expected to provide a running commentary while performing procedures, and / or examination. The marking scheme is specially designed for each station.

References

Medical education in Australia